Goldspur or Golden Spur is a Golden Delicious-like apple cultivar which is spur bearing. It is a very compact tree, dwarf and column growing.

It is compatible for cross pollination with: 'Dorsett Golden', 'Ein Shemer', 'Gala', 'Liberty', 'Prime Gold' and 'Spartan'. Needs lot of maintenance, but is highly rewarding.

See also
 Fruit tree pruning

References

External links
Apple Fruiting

Apple cultivars
American apples